The Ram's Head Device is a military special skill badge of the U.S. Army National Guard. The Ram's Head Device is awarded to any soldier after completion of the Army Mountain Warfare School (AMWS), based at the Ethan Allen Firing Range in Jericho, Vermont. The badge is authorized for wear on the uniform of Vermont National Guard soldiers and those Army National Guard units belonging to the 86th Infantry Brigade Combat Team (Mountain) from other states, such as:
 1st Battalion, 102nd Infantry Regiment (Mountain) (CT NG)
 1st Battalion, 157th Infantry Regiment (Mountain) (CO NG)
 3rd Battalion, 172nd Infantry Regiment (Mountain) (NH NG, ME NG, and VT NG)
 1st Battalion, 101st Field Artillery Regiment (MA NG and VT NG)
However, this badge is widely worn by other graduates of the Army Mountain Warfare School though not officially authorized. The award is authorized for wear by commanders discretion in most state Army National Guards.

History
The Ram's Head Device, is derived from the 85th Infantry Regimental crest which is topped by a ram's head symbolizing a unit skilled in mountain activity. The 85th was one of three regiments comprising the 10th Light Division (Alpine) when it was activated in July 1943. In the 1950s, the United States Army Mountain and Cold Weather Training Command at Fort Carson and Camp Hale, Colorado adopted the Ram's Head Device as the badge worn by their cadre.

In 1983, the Vermont Army National Guard Mountain Warfare School was established in Jericho, Vermont. The Ram's Head Device was adopted as the Military Mountaineer Badge denoting successful completion of the Basic Military Mountaineer Course (BMMC) and awarding of the Skill Qualification Identifier – E "Military Mountaineer." In 2003 the Vermont Army Mountain Warfare School became the United States Army Mountain Warfare School.

Wear of the Ram's Head Device
DA PAM 670-1 paragraph 20-5, section j, discusses National Guard awards generally:

Excerpt from the State of Vermont Adjutant General's Office Permanent Order 121-01 (1 May 2006):

New Award Criteria
When the Army Mountain Warfare School was put under the control of U.S. Army Training and Doctrine Command in 2009, only the BMMC (Summer) or BMMC (Winter) must be completed to earn the Special Qualification Identifier "E" {Military Mountaineer}, not both.  Also, with the updated "History of the Ram’s Head Device" document (dated 5 September 2013) stating, "The Army Mountain Warfare School continues to award the Ram’s Head Device to soldiers who complete the BMMC." alludes that completion of only one of the phases of training (summer or winter) is now required to be awarded the Ram's Head Device.

See also
Military badges of the United States
Badges of the United States Army
Marksmanship badges – National Guard competition badges
Recruiter badges – National Guard Recruiting and Retention Badges
Awards and decorations of the United States military
Awards and decorations of the United States Army
Awards and decorations of the National Guard

References

United States military badges